Ad-Dann, historically known as Hisn Naʽman, is a village in Wusab Al Ali District of Dhamar Governorate, Yemen. It serves as the seat of the district.

History 
According to the 14th-century author Wajih al-Din al-Hubayshi, who wrote a history of Wusab, ad-Dann (known then as Hisn Naʽman) originated during pre-Islamic times, and the Sulayhids had later built a castle atop the ruins. The Sulayhid ruler Ali al-Sulayhi resided here for several years during the mid-11th century, and he had extended the castle here; in 1064, he also commissioned a Great Mosque in nearby Qardah (identified with modern Harurah in the territory of the Bani Shu'ayb).

References 

Populated places in Dhamar Governorate